Clydau (sometimes Clydaï or Clydey) is a community and parish in Pembrokeshire, Wales.

Name
The meaning of the Welsh placename is uncertain, although the church is now dedicated to St. Clydaï, an alleged daughter of Brychan.

History
During the early Middle Ages, the settlement was the site of Llangeneu ('St Ceneus'), which was accounted one of the seven principal sees of Dyfed despite having no endowment of land.

Cledau (as Cledye) appears on a 1578 parish map of Pembrokeshire.

Josiah Thomas Jones (1799-1873), republican and Welsh nationalist, was born at CwmHir Farm, Clydau. He went on to publish many books and established several newspapers in English and Welsh, including the Aberdare Times.

Settlement

Community
Although the settlement of Clydau is tiny, the community is large, encompassing several other settlements and/or parishes including Bwlchygroes, Star, Tegryn, West Cilrhedyn and a large number of scattered farms. Clydau has its own elected community council and gives its name to an electoral ward of Pembrokeshire County Council.  The electoral ward of Clydau covers the communities of Clydau and Boncath. In 2001 it had a population (2001) of 1,425, with 58% Welsh speakers, falling to 715 in 2011.

Parish
The Afon Cneifa, a tributary of Afon Cych, divides the parish into two ancient divisions: Uwchlawrllan to the southeast and Islawrllan to the northwest. The population of the parish was 1,100 (1801), 1,457 (1851), 1,057 (1901), 829 (1951), 681 (2001), 715 (2011). The percentage of Welsh speakers was: 99 (1891), 97 (1931) and 91 (1971).

The 14th century Grade II-listed parish church is dedicated to Ste. Clydaï. It was rebuilt in the late 19th century, but the tower and some other parts of the building are original.

References

External links
 Further historical information and sources on GENUKI
 Clydau Church website
 Community Council

Villages in Pembrokeshire
Communities in Pembrokeshire